The Apartment: Passion For Design is the sixth season of the reality show competition The Apartment which is the longest running reality television show in Asia. The contestants are 12 up-and-coming interior designers competing for a luxury apartment at Johor Bahru, Malaysia. Its judges are Laurence Llewelyn-Bowen, Tyler Wisler, and Cat Arambulo-Antonio. With the sixth season an online digital series, The Apartment Unboxed, was launched including additional content. Fashion designer Stephanie Dods won the competition becoming the second Filipino to win after Deankie and Tiara in Season 3.

Contestants

Judges

 Jamie Durie
 Laurence Llewelyn-Bowen
 Tyler Wisler
 Cat Arambulo-Antonio

Episodes

Teams

Elimination 

 Green background and WINNER means the contestant won The Apartment - Passion for Design.
 Silver background and RUNNER-UP means the contestant was the runner-up on The Apartment - Passion for Design.
 Blue background and WIN means the contestant won that challenge.
 Pink background and BTM 3 mean the contestant worst challenge but safe.
 Orange background and BTM 2 mean the contestant worst challenge but safe.
 Purple background and ELIM means the contestant win and was eliminated of the competition.
 Red background and ELIM means the contestant lost and was eliminated of the competition.

References

2018 Malaysian television seasons
Celebrity reality television series
Home renovation television series
Malaysian reality television series
Television shows filmed in Malaysia